Alexandra Talomaa (born 1975) is a Swedish songwriter who has written songs for A-Teens, Anders Fernette (previously Johansson), Backstreet Boys, Darin, Westlife and others.

References 

1975 births
Swedish songwriters
Living people